Lacustricola is a genus of poeciliids native to East, Southern and Middle Africa.

Species
There are currently 20 recognized species in this genus:

 Lacustricola atripinna (Pfeffer, 1896)
 Lacustricola bukobanus (C. G. E. Ahl, 1924) (Bukoba lampeye)
 Lacustricola centralis (Seegers, 1996) (Central East African lampeye)
 Lacustricola jeanneli (Pellegrin, 1935) (Omo lampeye)
 Lacustricola kassenjiensis (C. G. E. Ahl, 1924) (Kasenye lampeye)
 Lacustricola katangae (Boulenger, 1912) (Striped topminnow)
 Lacustricola kongoranensis (C. G. E. Ahl, 1924) (Kongoro lampeye)
 Lacustricola lacustris (Seegers, 1984) (Kibiti lampeye)
 Lacustricola lualabaensis (Poll, 1938) (Lualaba lampeye)
 Lacustricola macrurus (Boulenger, 1904) (Big tailed lampeye)
 Lacustricola maculatus (Klausewitz, 1957) (Spotted lampeye)
 Lacustricola matthesi (Seegers, 1996) (Saisi lampeye)
 Lacustricola mediolateralis (Poll, 1967)
 Lacustricola moeruensis (Boulenger, 1914) (Moero lampeye)
 Lacustricola myaposae (Boulenger, 1908) (Natal topminnow)
 Lacustricola nigrolateralis (Poll, 1967)
 Lacustricola omoculatus (Wildekamp, 1977) (Ruaha lampeye)
 Lacustricola pumilus (Boulenger, 1906) (Tanganyika lampeye)
 Lacustricola usanguensis (Wildekamp, 1977) (Usangu lampeye)
 Lacustricola vitschumbaensis (C. G. E. Ahl, 1924) (Bitschumbi lampeye)

References

 
Poeciliidae
Fish of Africa
Freshwater fish genera
Taxa named by George S. Myers
Ray-finned fish genera